"I Get Money" is a single by American rapper Birdman. It was originally supposed to be included on a fifth studio album called Bigga Than Life. It features fellow American rappers Lil Wayne and Mack Maine and American singer T-Pain and was produced by the Runners, co-produced by the Monarch and Infamous.

Music video
The video was released in May 2011. It was features cameos from Lil Twist, Ace Hood, Jae Millz, DJ Khaled and Busta Rhymes.

Track listing
 "I Get Money" – 4:27

Charts

References

2011 singles
2011 songs
Birdman (rapper) songs
T-Pain songs
Mack Maine songs
Lil Wayne songs
Cash Money Records singles
Songs written by Andrew Harr
Songs written by Jermaine Jackson (hip hop producer)
Songs written by Lil Wayne
Songs written by Birdman (rapper)
Song recordings produced by the Runners